West One is also the name of a retail park in Salford.

West One is a mixed-use development at the centre of the Devonshire Quarter in the city centre of Sheffield, South Yorkshire, England.  It comprises bars, restaurants and shops at ground-level (including the large Revolution bar) and apartments housing over 1,000 people above, including a penthouse.  It faces onto Devonshire Green, (restored in 2007) and provides easy  access to the Moor and Division Street. The West One Peak lift has been out of commission since October 2022.

External links
Sheffield City Centre Guide

Buildings and structures in Sheffield